Pyridinetricarboxylic acid is a group of organic compounds which are tricarboxylic derivatives of pyridine. Pyridinetricarboxylic acid comes in several isomers:

2,3,4-Pyridinetricarboxylic acid
2,3,5-Pyridinetricarboxylic acid
2,3,6-Pyridinetricarboxylic acid
Berberonic acid (2,4,5-Pyridinetricarboxylic acid)
Collidinic acid (2,4,6-Pyridinetricarboxylic acid)
3,4,5-Pyridinetricarboxylic acid

All isomers share the molecular weight 211,13 g/mol and the chemical formula C8H5NO6.

Pyridines
Tricarboxylic acids